Istinja is the Islamic term for the action of using water to clean oneself after urinating and/or defecating.

Istinja is obligatory; this means removing whatever has been passed from the genitals or the rectum with water. Toilet paper and other clean implements like stones can be used in addition to water to aid in purifying the area. Istijmar is the equivalent action just using stones, toilet paper, or anything else that is pure without the water. 

The aim of this is to remove the impurity and maintain hygiene in accordance with Islamic law and principal. 

Water is standard for toilet hygiene within Muslim homes and countries, where a series of vessels that carry water (such as the tabo/cebok in Maritime Southeast Asia, the buta  in West Africa, or lota/bodna in the Indian subcontinent) and internationally, the shattaf bidet shower, are used instead of, or in addition to, toilet roll.

Ritual purity 
The istinja is part of Islamic hygienical jurisprudence and general ritual purity of body and soul in Islam.

The Quran says:

See also 
 Ghusl
 Tahir
 Wudu
 Tayammum
 Tabo (hygiene)
 Bidet

References

Etiquette by situation
Ritual purity in Islam
Arabic words and phrases in Sharia
Arabic words and phrases
Toilet etiquett
Islamic terminology
Ismaili theology